Raja Shivchatrapati is a Marathi historical TV drama based on Chhatrapati Shivaji Maharaj, founder of the Maratha Empire. The serial was re-broadcast in April 2020 during the COVID-19 pandemic.

Summary 
Chatrapati Shivaji Maharaj, born at Shivneri fort, establishes the Maratha kingdom against all odds by fighting against the Mughal dynasty.

Cast 
 Amol Kolhe as Chhatrapati Shivaji Maharaj
 Mrinal Kulkarni as Rajmata Jijabai
 Avinash Narkar as Shahaji Raje Bhosale
 Yatin Karyekar as Aurangzeb
 Rujuta Deshmmukh as Maharani Saibai
 Neelam Shirke as Maharani Soyrabai
 Prasad Pandit as Baji Prabhu Deshpande
 Shantanu Moghe as Murarbaji Deshpande
 Swapnil Rajshekhar as Netaji Palkar
 Sanjay Mohite as Bahirji Naik
 Vidyadhar Joshi as Mirza Rajah Jai Singh
 Hardeek Joshi as Kartalab Khan
 Sunil Godse as Shaista Khan
 Samira Gujar as Maharani Putalabai

Production 
The program was created and produced by Hindi film's art director Nitin Chandrakant Desai. Amol Kolhe played lead role of Chhatrapati Shivaji Maharaj and Mrinal Kulkarni as Rajmata Jijabai. It was directed by Hemant Deodhar and filming took place at ND Studios, Karjat in Maharashtra. Balwant Moreshwar Purandare and Devendranath Kasar were consulted for historical content as can be seen from credit list of the serial.

References

External links 
 
 Raja Shivchatrapati at Hotstar

Marathi-language television shows
2008 Indian television series debuts
Star Pravah original programming
Indian period television series
Indian historical television series
Television series set in the 17th century
2009 Indian television series endings